Below are the squads for the 2013 EAFF East Asian Cup Preliminary Competition Round 2 in Hong Kong.

Head coach:  Holger Osieck

Head coach:  Chiang Mu-Tsai

Head coach:  Gary White

Head coach:  Kim Pan-Gon

Head coach:  Yun Jong-Su

References

EAFF E-1 Football Championship squads